Timothy Stonhouse-Vigor (18 September 17653 January 1831) was Archdeacon of Gloucester from 1804 until 1814.

He was the son of James Stonhouse (seventh baronet) and his wife Sarah née Ekins:  He married Charlotte Huntingford, daughter of Thomas (a vicar), on 6 July 1796: four of his five sons were clergymen. He was educated at Oriel College, Oxford. He was Vicar of Sunninghill, Berkshire before his years as Archdeacon. After this he was Chaplain to the Bishop of Hereford.

References

18th-century English Anglican priests
19th-century English Anglican priests
Alumni of Oriel College, Oxford
Archdeacons of Gloucester
1765 births
1831 deaths